This is a list of National Hockey League (NHL) players who have played at least one game in the NHL from 1917 to present and have a last name that starts with "L".

List updated as of the 2018–19 NHL season.

L'–La

 Moe L'Abbe
 Joel L'Esperance
 Teemu Laakso
 Antti Laaksonen
 Mike Labadie
 Kevin Labanc
 Jason LaBarbera
 Joseph LaBate
 Neil LaBatte
 Jean-Francois Labbe
 Marc LaBelle
 Leo Labine
 Gord Labossiere
 Max Labovitch
 Dan Labraaten
 Yvon Labre
 Patrick Labrecque
 Guy Labrie
 Pierre-Cedric Labrie
 Elmer Lach
 Michel Lachance
 Scott Lachance
 Blaine Lacher
 Eddie Lack
 Francois Lacombe
 Normand Lacombe
 Dan LaCosta
 Dan LaCouture
 Alphonse Lacroix
 Andre Lacroix
 Daniel Lacroix
 Eric Lacroix
 Pierre Lacroix
 Tanner Laczynski
 Andrew Ladd
 Randy Ladouceur
 Paul LaDue
 Nathan LaFayette
 Rick LaFerriere
 Sam Lafferty
 Christian Laflamme
 Guy Lafleur
 Rene Lafleur
 Pat LaFontaine
 Ernie Laforce
 Bob LaForest
 Mark Laforest
 Claude LaForge
 Marc Laforge
 Pete Laframboise
 Adelard Lafrance
 Leo Lafrance
 Alexis Lafreniere
 Jason Lafreniere
 Roger Lafreniere
 Jean-Guy Lagace
 Maxim Lagace
 William Lagesson
 Brooks Laich
 Tom Laidlaw
 Kellan Lain
 Patrik Laine
 Quintin Laing
 Rob Laird
 Serge Lajeunesse
 Simon Lajeunesse
 Maxime Lajoie
 Sasha Lakovic
 Hec Lalande
 David Laliberte
 Patrick Lalime
 Bobby Lalonde
 Edward "Newsy" Lalonde
 Ron Lalonde
 Shawn Lalonde
 Mike Lalor
 Joe Lamb
 Mark Lamb
 Dan Lambert
 Denny Lambert
 Lane Lambert
 Yvon Lambert
 Dick Lamby
 Jean Lamirande
 Hank Lammens
 Juho Lammikko
 Marc Lamothe
 Leo Lamoureux
 Mitch Lamoureux
 Bryce Lampman
 Mike Lampman
 Jack Lancien
 Anton Lander
 Gabriel Landeskog
 Larry Landon
 Eric Landry
 Gord Lane
 Myles Lane
 Robert Lang
 Darren Langdon
 Steve Langdon
 Pete Langelle
 Jamie Langenbrunner
 Chris Langevin
 Dave Langevin
 Josh Langfeld
 Marek Langhamer
 Daymond Langkow
 Scott Langkow
 Alain Langlais
 Al Langlois
 Charlie Langlois
 Rod Langway
 Jeff Lank
 Kevin Lankinen
 Jean-Marc Lanthier
 Ted Lanyon
 Rick Lanz
 Daniel Laperriere
 Ian Laperriere
 Jacques Laperriere
 Maxim Lapierre
 Darryl Laplante
 Claude Lapointe
 Guy Lapointe
 Martin Lapointe
 Rick Lapointe
 Nick Lappin
 Peter Lappin
 Edgar Laprade
 Ben "Bun" LaPrairie
 Georges Laraque
 Igor Larionov
 Garry Lariviere
 Dylan Larkin
 Drew Larman
 Jeff Larmer
 Steve Larmer
 Wildor Larochelle
 Denis Larocque
 Mario Larocque
 Michel "Bunny" Larocque
 Michel Larocque
 Chad LaRose
 Charles "Bonner" Larose
 Claude Larose (born 1942)
 Claude Larose (born 1955)
 Cory Larose
 Guy Larose
 Pierre Larouche
 Steve Larouche
 Brad Larsen
 Philip Larsen
 Norm Larson
 Reed Larson
 Adam Larsson
 Jacob Larsson
 Johan Larsson
 Tyler Larter
 Jan Lasak
 Brian Lashoff
 Matt Lashoff
 Gary Laskoski
 Jiri Latal
 Guillaume Latendresse
 James Latos
 Phil Latreille
 David Latta
 Michael Latta
 Marty Lauder
 Michael Lauen
 Brad Lauer
 Craig Laughlin
 Mike Laughton
 Scott Laughton
 Janne Laukkanen
 Don "Red" Laurence
 Oliver Lauridsen
 Paul Laus
 Jeremy Lauzon
 Kevin LaVallee
 Mark LaVarre
 Brian Lavender
 Eric Lavigne
 Peter Laviolette
 Jack Laviolette
 Dominic Lavoie
 Kirby Law
 Paul Lawless
 Mark Lawrence
 Danny Lawson
 Brian Lawton
 Derek Laxdal
 Gordon Laxton
 Hal Laycoe
 Curtis Lazar
 Jeff Lazaro

Le

 Jamie Leach
 Jay Leach
 Larry Leach
 Reggie Leach
 Steve Leach
 Pat Leahy
 Jim Leavins
 Brett Lebda
 Patrick Lebeau
 Stephan Lebeau
 Drew LeBlanc
 Fern LeBlanc
 Jean-Paul LeBlanc
 John LeBlanc
 Louis Leblanc
 Peter LeBlanc
 Ray LeBlanc
 Peter Leboutillier
 Al LeBrun
 Bill LeCaine
 Vincent Lecavalier
 Jack LeClair
 John LeClair
 Pascal Leclaire
 Mike Leclerc
 Rene LeClerc
 Doug Lecuyer
 Nick Leddy
 Per Ledin
 Walt Ledingham
 Albert "Battleship" Leduc
 Rich LeDuc
 Grant Ledyard
 Anders Lee
 Brian Lee
 Ed Lee
 Peter Lee
 Brad Leeb
 Greg Leeb
 Gary Leeman
 Brian Leetch
 Guillaume Lefebvre
 Patrice Lefebvre
 Sylvain Lefebvre
 Bryan Lefley
 Chuck Lefley
 Manny Legace
 Roger Leger
 Barry Legge
 Randy Legge
 Claude Legris
 David Legwand
 Artturi Lehkonen
 Hugh Lehman
 Scott Lehman
 Tommy Lehmann
 Robin Lehner
 Yanick Lehoux
 Jori Lehtera
 Jere Lehtinen
 Petteri Lehto
 Antero Lehtonen
 Kari Lehtonen
 Mikko Lehtonen (born 1978)
 Mikko Lehtonen (born 1987)
 Mikko Lehtonen (born 1994)
 Hank Lehvonen
 Edward Leier
 Taylor Leier
 Michael Leighton
 Ville Leino
 Mikko Leinonen
 Brendan Leipsic
 Bob Leiter
 Ken Leiter
 Josh Leivo
 Jacques Lemaire
 Moe Lemay
 Reggie Lemelin
 Roger Lemelin
 Alain Lemieux
 Bob Lemieux
 Brendan Lemieux
 Claude Lemieux
 Jacques Lemieux
 Jean Lemieux
 Jocelyn Lemieux
 Mario Lemieux
 Real Lemieux
 Richard Lemieux
 Tim Lenardon
 Mike Lenarduzzi
 David LeNeveu
 John Leonard
 Jordan Leopold
 Alfred "Pit" Lepine
 Hector Lepine
 Sami Lepisto
 Brett Lernout
 Francois Leroux
 Gaston Leroux
 Jean-Yves Leroux
 Curtis Leschyshyn
 Art Lesieur
 Otto Leskinen
 Francis Lessard
 Junior Lessard
 Mario Lessard
 Rick Lessard
 Lucas Lessio
 Bill Lesuk
 Jack Leswick
 Pete Leswick
 Tony Leswick
 Alan Letang
 Kris Letang
 Mark Letestu
 Pierre-Luc Letourneau-Leblond
 Trevor Letowski
 Vinni Lettieri
 Maxim Letunov
 Joe Levandoski
 Jean-Louis Levasseur
 Normand Leveille
 Guy Leveque
 Don Lever
 Craig Levie
 Scott Levins
 Alex Levinsky
 Tapio Levo
 Danny Lewicki
 Tyler Lewington
 Dale Lewis
 Dave Lewis
 Doug Lewis
 Grant Lewis
 Herbie Lewis
 Trevor Lewis
 Rick Ley

Li

 Mike Liambas
 Igor Liba
 Jeff Libby
 Nick Libett
 Tony Licari
 Bob Liddington
 Doug Lidster
 Nicklas Lidstrom
 Nathan Lieuwen
 David Liffiton
 John-Michael Liles
 Andreas Lilja
 Jakob Lilja
 Timothy Liljegren
 John Lilley
 Juha Lind
 Anders Lindback
 Chris Lindberg
 Oscar Lindberg
 Tobias Lindberg
 Pelle Lindbergh
 Matt Lindblad
 Oskar Lindblom
 Petteri Lindbohm
 Johan Lindbom
 Esa Lindell
 Jamie Linden
 Trevor Linden
 Charlie Lindgren
 Lars Lindgren
 Mats Lindgren
 Perttu Lindgren
 Ryan Lindgren
 Anton Lindholm
 Elias Lindholm
 Hampus Lindholm
 Mikael Lindholm
 Par Lindholm
 Brett Lindros
 Eric Lindros
 Bert Lindsay
 Bill Lindsay
 Ted Lindsay
 Gustav Lindstrom
 Joakim Lindstrom
 Willy Lindstrom
 David Ling
 Charles Linglet
 Ken Linseman
 Richard Lintner
 JC Lipon
 Chris LiPuma
 Carl Liscombe
 Enver Lisin
 Bryan Little
 Neil Little
 David Littman
 Ed Litzenberger
 Mike Liut
 Blake Lizotte

Lo

 Lonnie Loach
 Jacques Locas
 Bill Lochead
 Corey Locke
 Ken Lockett
 Howie "Holes" Lockhart
 Norm Locking
 Darcy Loewen
 Mark Lofthouse
 Bob Logan
 Dave Logan 
 Claude Loiselle
 Martin Lojek
 Andrei Loktionov
 Andrei Lomakin
 Matthew Lombardi
 Ryan Lomberg
 Brian Loney
 Troy Loney
 Barry Long
 Stan Long
 Ross Lonsberry
 Hakan Loob
 Peter Loob
 Viktor Loov
 Pete LoPresti
 Sam LoPresti
 Jim Lorentz
 Steven Lorentz
 Danny Lorenz
 Bob Lorimer
 Matt Lorito
 Rod Lorrain
 Clem Loughlin
 Wilf Loughlin
 Ron Loustel
 Ben Lovejoy
 Ken Lovsin
 Reed Low
 Ron Low
 Dwayne Lowdermilk
 Darren Lowe
 Keegan Lowe
 Kevin Lowe
 Norman "Odie" Lowe
 Ross Lowe
 Eddie Lowrey
 Fred Lowrey
 Gerry Lowrey
 Adam Lowry
 Dave Lowry
 Lynn Loyns
 Larry Lozinski

Lu–Ly

 Dan Lucas
 Dave Lucas
 Don Luce
 Milan Lucic
 Jan Ludvig
 Craig Ludwig
 Steve Ludzik
 Matt Luff
 Warren Luhning
 Bernie Lukowich
 Brad Lukowich
 Morris Lukowich
 Chuck Luksa
 Dave Lumley
 Harry Lumley
 Jyrki Lumme
 Pentti Lund
 Brian Lundberg
 Len Lunde
 Isac Lundestrom
 Bengt Lundholm
 Mike Lundin
 Jamie Lundmark
 Henrik Lundqvist
 Joel Lundqvist
 Joe Lundrigan
 Tord Lundstrom
 Pat Lundy
 Chris Luongo
 Roberto Luongo
 Eetu Luostarinen
 Joona Luoto
 Ross Lupaschuk
 Gilles Lupien
 Gary Lupul
 Joffrey Lupul
 Roman Lyashenko
 Toni Lydman
 George Lyle
 Jack Lynch
 Vic Lynn
 Alex Lyon
 Steve Lyon
 Ron "Peaches" Lyons
 Brett Lysak
 Tom Lysiak
 Roman Lyubimov
 Ilya Lyubushkin

See also
 hockeydb.com NHL Player List - L

Players